Chx may refer to:

Chamonix, a town in the French Alps
Chancellor of the Exchequer
Chicago Stock Exchange
Charing Cross railway station (National Rail code) in London
Chlorhexidine: A disinfectant and topical anti-infective agent used also as mouthwash to prevent oral plaque
CHX, the IATA airport code for Changuinola "Capitán Manuel Niño" International Airport in Changuinola, Panama 
Cycloheximide, an inhibitor of protein biosynthesis in eukaryotic cells